Cremastocheilus nitens is a species of scarab beetle in the family Scarabaeidae.

References

Further reading

 

Cetoniinae
Articles created by Qbugbot
Beetles described in 1853